The 2014 National Football League known for sponsorship reasons as the Allianz National Football League was the 83rd staging of the National Football League (NFL), an annual Gaelic football tournament for the Gaelic Athletic Association county teams of Ireland. The League began on Saturday 1 February 2014. Thirty-one Gaelic football county teams from the island of Ireland, plus London, participated.

Dublin won their second title in a row and eleventh in total after a 3-19 to 1-10 win against Derry in the final on 27 April at Croke Park.

Format

League structure
The 2014 format of the National Football League was a system of four divisions of eight teams. Each team played every other team in its division once, either home or away. 2 points were awarded for a win and 1 for a draw.

Tie-breaker
If only two teams were level on league points -
 The team that won the head-to-head match was ranked first
 If this game was a draw, score difference (total scored minus total conceded in all games) was used to rank the teams
 If score difference was identical, total scored was used to rank the teams
 If the two teams were still level, a play-off was required
If three or more teams were level on league points, points difference was used to rank the teams.

Finals, promotions and relegations
The top four teams in Division 1 contested the 2014 NFL semi-finals (first played fourth and second played third) and final. The top two teams in divisions 2, 3 and 4 were promoted, and contested the finals of their respective divisions. The bottom two teams in divisions 1, 2 and 3 were relegated.

Division 1

Table

Rounds 1 to 7

Division 1 Semi-finals

Division 1 Final

Division 2

Table

Rounds 1 to 7

Division 2 Final

Division 3

Table

Rounds 1 to 7

Division 3 Final

Division 4

Table

Rounds 1 to 7

Division 4 Final

Statistics
All scores correct as of 19 April 2016

Scoring
Widest winning margin: 19
 Carlow 1-8 - 2-24 Tipperary (Division 4)
 Down 4-16 - 0-9 Louth (Division 2)
Most goals in a match: 7
 Meath 3-18 - 4-11 Galway (Division 2)
 Fermanagh 4-10 - 3-17 Roscommon (Division 3)
Most points in a match: 37
 Tipperary 3-20 - 2-17 Antrim (Division 4)
 Kildare 2-19 - 2-18 Mayo (Division 1)
 Kildare 1-21 - 3-16 Tyrone (Division 1)
Most goals by one team in a match: 5
 Leitrim 0-16 - 5-16 Tipperary (Division 4)
 Highest aggregate score: 52 points
 Tipperary 3-20 - 2-17 Antrim (Division 4)
Lowest aggregate score: 16 points
 Antrim 0-6 - 0-10 Clare (Division 4)

Top scorers
Overall

Single game

References

 
National Football League
National Football League (Ireland) seasons